This glossary gives a general overview of the various sound laws that have been formulated by linguists for the various Indo-European languages. A concise description is given for each rule; more details are given in their articles.

Within Proto-Indo-European or multiple branches

Balto-Slavic

Baltic

Slavic

Germanic

Indo-Iranian

In all words or word-groups of four or more syllables bearing the chief accent on a long syllable, a short unaccented medial vowel was necessarily syncopated, but might be restored by analogy

Italic

Further reading
 

sound laws in the Indo-European languages
Sound laws
Indo-European linguistics
Wikipedia glossaries using description lists